The Sphingobacteriales is an order of environmental bacteria.

See also
 List of bacteria genera
 List of bacterial orders

References

Sphingobacteriia
Bacteria orders